Westhampton is a community in Fairfax County, Virginia, United States.

References

Unincorporated communities in Fairfax County, Virginia
Washington metropolitan area
Unincorporated communities in Virginia